The 1949 Maryland State Raiders football team was an American football team that represented Maryland State College (now known as University of Maryland Eastern Shore) during the 1949 college football season. In their second season under head coach Vernon McCain, the team compiled an 8–0 record, shut out seven of eight opponents, outscored all opponents by a total of 310 to 8, and was ranked No. 6 among the nation's black college football teams according to the Pittsburgh Courier and its Dickinson Rating System. 

The November 15 game against Trenton State Teachers College (now known as The College of New Jersey) was the first interracial game played on the Eastern Shore of Maryland. Maryland State played a second interracial game the following week against Glassboro State Teachers College.

Maryland State halfback Sylvester Polk who led the nation with 129 points scored. Other key players included T-slotter Calvin Martin and guard Donald Thomas.

Schedule

References

Maryland State
Maryland Eastern Shore Hawks football seasons
College football undefeated seasons
Maryland State Raiders football